Martin Kjell Henrik Ericsson (born 4 September 1980) is a Swedish former professional footballer who played as a midfielder. He represented IK Brage, IFK Göteborg, Aalborg BK, Brøndby IF, IF Elfsborg, and BK Häcken during a career that spanned between 1998 and 2016. He won nine caps for the Sweden national football team between 2004 and 2009.

Club career 

Born in Gustafs, he played for Swedish club Tunabro SK, before turning professional with IK Brage and IFK Göteborg. In the summer of 2004, he moved to Denmark to play for Aalborg BK in the Danish Superliga. He was the natural playmaker of the team, and quickly became the star of the Aalborg club. In the 2005 winter transfer window, he moved to defending Danish champions Brøndby IF, where he received the prestigious number 10 shirt. Ericsson scored in his Superliga debut match for Brøndby, a 3–0 win against archrivals Copenhagen. On 3 December 2009, he signed with IF Elfsborg.

International career 
After having appeared for the Sweden U19 and U21 teams, Ericsson made his full international debut for Sweden on 22 January 2004 in a friendly game against Norway. He won his ninth and final cap in a friendly game against Mexico on 28 January 2009 where he played for 87 minutes before being replaced by Gustav Svensson.

Career statistics

International

References

External links
  
  
  
 
 

1980 births
Living people
Swedish footballers
Association football midfielders
Sweden international footballers
Sweden under-21 international footballers
IK Brage players
IFK Göteborg players
Swedish expatriate footballers
Expatriate men's footballers in Denmark
Danish Superliga players
AaB Fodbold players
Swedish expatriate sportspeople in Denmark
Brøndby IF players
IF Elfsborg players
BK Häcken players
Allsvenskan players